Andrew Scott Bodnarchuk (born July 11, 1988) is a Canadian professional ice hockey defenceman for the Nürnberg Ice Tigers of the Deutsche Eishockey Liga (DEL). Bodnarchuk was born in Drumheller, Alberta, but grew up in Hammonds Plains, Nova Scotia.

Playing career
Bodnarchuk played junior hockey in the Quebec Major Junior Hockey League (QMJHL) with the Halifax Mooseheads. He was drafted by the Bruins in the fifth round of the 2006 NHL Entry Draft. After spending most of the 2009–10 season with the Providence Bruins of the American Hockey League (AHL), Bodnarchuk made his NHL debut on April 3, 2010, in a 2–1 overtime victory against the Toronto Maple Leafs.

On July 6, 2012, Bodnarchuk signed as a free agent to a one-year contract with the Los Angeles Kings. He was assigned to the Kings' AHL affiliate, the Manchester Monarchs, with which he later won the Calder Cup with in the 2014–15 season.

On July 2, 2015, Bodnarchuk left the Kings organization as a free agent and signed a one-year, two-way contract with the Columbus Blue Jackets. Following a promising training camp in Columbus, he was assigned to begin the 2015–16 season with Columbus' AHL affiliate, the Lake Erie Monsters. In 14 games, Bodnarchuk was leading the Monsters defence on the top pairing, contributing with 8 points, before he was recalled to the Blue Jackets on November 21, 2015. He made his debut with Columbus, playing his first NHL game since 2010, in a 5–3 defeat against the San Jose Sharks the following day. In his 11th career game, Bodnarchuk recorded his first NHL point in a 2–1 shootout loss to the Florida Panthers on December 4, 2015.

Bodnarchuk played in 16 games with the Blue Jackets before he was placed on waivers in order to return to the Monsters. On January 5, 2016, Bodnarchuck was claimed off of waivers by the Colorado Avalanche. He made his debut with the Avalanche playing alongside defensive partner François Beauchemin in a 4–3 victory over the St. Louis Blues on January 6, 2016.

At the conclusion of his contract, Bodnarchuk left the Avalanche as a free agent to sign a two-year, two-way contract with the Dallas Stars on July 1, 2016. Added to the Stars organization to provide a depth option on the blueline, Bodnarchuk was assigned to Dallas' AHL affiliate, the Texas Stars, for the duration of his contract. In the 2017–18 season, he helped Texas reach the Calder Cup finals before losing a Game 7 decider to the Toronto Marlies.

As an impending free agent, Bodnarchuk opted to sign his first contract abroad, agreeing to a two-year deal with reigning three-time defending German champions EHC München of the Deutsche Eishockey Liga (DEL) on June 18, 2018.

On August 23, 2020, Bodnarchuk continued his tenure in the DEL, signing a one-year contract with the Nürnberg Ice Tigers.

Career statistics

Regular season and playoffs

International

Awards and honours

References

External links

 

1988 births
Living people
Boston Bruins draft picks
Boston Bruins players
Canadian expatriate ice hockey players in Germany
Canadian ice hockey defencemen
Colorado Avalanche players
Columbus Blue Jackets players
EHC München players
Halifax Mooseheads players
Ice hockey people from Alberta
Ice hockey people from Nova Scotia
Lake Erie Monsters players
Manchester Monarchs (AHL) players
Nürnberg Ice Tigers players
People from Drumheller
Providence Bruins players
Sportspeople from Halifax, Nova Scotia
Texas Stars players